George Cresse Fisher (August 20, 1855 – January 29, 1937) was a Major League Baseball player. Fisher played most of his games at second base (six games for the National League Cleveland Blues) or in center field
(six games for the Union Association Wilmington Quicksteps).

External links

Major League Baseball outfielders
Major League Baseball second basemen
Cleveland Blues (NL) players
Wilmington Quicksteps players
Erie (minor league baseball) players
Springfield Champion City players
Grand Rapids (minor league baseball) players
Minneapolis Millers (baseball) players
Wilmington Blue Hens players
Atlantic City (minor league baseball) players
Vallejo (minor league baseball) players
Baseball players from Wilmington, Delaware
1855 births
1937 deaths
19th-century baseball players